Latvian Basketball Cup (Latvian: Latvijas kauss basketbolā), for sponsorship reasons known as Latvijas Basketbola Užavas kauss, is an annual national domestic basketball cup competition in Latvia. It is organised by the Latvian Basketball Association. After 26 years long absence, it was restored in 2020. However, due to COVID-19 pandemic the first season was cancelled. In the season 2021-22 the cup was finally played, and BK VEF Rīga won it for the first time.

History
Latvian Basketball Cup was first organized since 1948 to 1952 and since 1960 to 1994. After former Latvia NT player Kristaps Janičenoks became the director of Latvian Basketball League, he restored the competition in 2020. However, due to COVID-19 pandemic the first season was cancelled after the first games. 

In the 2021-22 season Užavas Beer production became the title sponsor of the tournament. On March 7, VEF Rīga won the title, beating BK Ventspils in the final, which was held in Ventspils.

2022-23 was the second full season of the restored competition. The same amount of teams participated as the previous year - 21. There was a couple of surprising results, as second division teams BK Gulbenes Buki and Kandava/Anzāģe won the first division teams, Valmiera Glass VIA and BK Liepāja respectively, in first games of ties. However, in second games first division teams always came back on won ties to qualify for the next rounds. Draw decided that the first season finalists BK VEF Rīga and BK Ventspils met in the semi-final already. Title defenders VEF won the tie and went back to the Final, where it met BK Liepāja. Final was played on 19th January, 2023, in Liepāja.

Format
Every basketball team in Latvia is allowed to participate in the tournament, even if it's an amateur level team. Professional teams join the tournament, starting from the quarter-finals. Tournament is played in the knockout format, teams playing against each other over two legs on a home-and-away basis, with the overall cumulative score determining the winner of a round. Thus, the score of one single game can be tied. Final is played in one game.

Winners

Half-time performers

External links 
 Official tournament website 
 Official Latvian Basketball Association YouTube channel

References

Basketball in Latvia
Basketball cup competitions in Europe